Carpenter's Station, Kentucky, originally "Carpenter's Fort", was established about  west of present-day Hustonville, Kentucky, on the present-day county line between Casey and Lincoln counties, by three brothers, George, John, and Adam Carpenter, who ventured there from Rockingham County, Virginia, in the summer of 1779.  The brothers were of Germanic descent, sons of George Zimmerman (Zimmermann anglicizes to Carpenter), who was born c. 1720 in Switzerland, emigrated to the colony of Pennsylvania around 1740, and settled in Rockingham County before the American Revolutionary War.

References

German-American culture in Kentucky
History of Kentucky
Colonial settlements in North America
Unincorporated communities in Casey County, Kentucky
Swiss-American history